The 2007 WGC-CA Championship was a golf tournament that was contested from March 22–25 over the Blue Monster Course at  Doral Golf Resort & Spa in Doral, Florida. It was the eighth WGC-CA Championship tournament, and the second of three World Golf Championships events held in 2007. It was the first tournament under the sponsorship of CA, Inc. and took the place of the Ford Championship at Doral on the PGA Tour schedule.

World number 1 Tiger Woods was the two-time defending champion and won the tournament to capture his third consecutive and sixth overall WGC-CA Championship and his 13th World Golf Championships title. This was the second time Woods captured three consecutive titles at the same WCG event (he also won NEC Invitational from 1999−2001). Later in 2007, Woods would win a third consecutive WGC-Bridgestone Invitational title (formerly known as the NEC Invitational).  Geoff Ogilvy and Dustin Johnson are the only other players in WGC history to win at least three WGC titles.

Field
1. Top 50 players from the Official World Golf Rankings two weeks prior to event
Robert Allenby (2), Stephen Ames (2,3), Stuart Appleby (2,3), Aaron Baddeley (2,4,5), Bart Bryant (2), Ángel Cabrera (2,6), Chad Campbell (2,3), Michael Campbell (2,7,8), Paul Casey (2,6,7,8), K. J. Choi (2,3), Stewart Cink (2,3), Tim Clark (2), Chris DiMarco (2), Luke Donald (2,3,6), Joe Durant (2,3), Ernie Els (2,3,6,7,8), Niclas Fasth (2,6), Jim Furyk (2,3), Sergio García (2,6), Lucas Glover (2,3), Retief Goosen (2,3,6,7,8), Paul Goydos (2,4,5), Pádraig Harrington (2,6), Charles Howell III (2,4,5), David Howell (2,6), Trevor Immelman (2,3,7,8), Robert Karlsson (2,6), Shingo Katayama (2,10), Davis Love III (2,3), Phil Mickelson (2,3,4,5), Colin Montgomerie (2,6), Arron Oberholser (2,3), Geoff Ogilvy (2,3), Nick O'Hern (2,7,8,11), José María Olazábal (2), Rod Pampling (2,3), Carl Pettersson (2,3), Ian Poulter (2,6), Rory Sabbatini (2,3), Adam Scott (2,3), Jeev Milkha Singh (2,6,9,10), Vijay Singh (2,3,4,5), Henrik Stenson (2,5,6,7,8), Steve Stricker (2), David Toms (2,3), Mike Weir (2), Brett Wetterich (2,3), Tiger Woods (2,3,4,5), Yang Yong-eun (2,7,8)
Justin Rose (2,7,8) did not play.

2. Top 50 players from the Official World Golf Rankings one week prior to event

3. Top 30 from the final 2006 PGA Tour money list
Ben Curtis, J. J. Henry, Zach Johnson, Tom Pernice Jr., Brett Quigley, Dean Wilson

4. Top 10 from the PGA Tour FedEx Cup points list two weeks prior to event
Mark Calcavecchia (5), Charley Hoffman, John Rollins (5), Mark Wilson (5)

5. Top 10 from the PGA Tour FedEx Cup points list one week prior to event

6. Top 20 from the final 2006 European Tour Order of Merit
John Bickerton, Thomas Bjørn, Paul Broadhurst, Johan Edfors, Charl Schwartzel (12), Anthony Wall

7. Top 10 from the European Tour Order of Merit two weeks prior to event
Anton Haig (8)

8. Top 10 from the European Tour Order of Merit one week prior to event

9. Top 3 from the final 2006 Asian Tour Order of Merit
Thongchai Jaidee, Prom Meesawat

10. Top 3 from the final 2006 Japan Golf Tour Order of Merit
Hideto Tanihara

11. Top 3 from the final 2006 PGA Tour of Australasia Order of Merit
Nathan Green, Kevin Stadler

12. Top 3 from the final 2006-07 Sunshine Tour Order of Merit
Louis Oosthuizen, Hennie Otto

Round summaries

First round

Second round

Third round

Final round

Scorecard

Cumulative tournament scores, relative to par

Source:

References

External links
Full results

WGC Championship
Golf in Florida
WGC-CA Championship
WGC-CA Championship
WGC-CA Championship
WGC-CA Championship